Constituency PK-48 (Abbottabad-V) is a constituency for the Khyber Pakhtunkhwa Assembly of the Khyber Pakhtunkhwa province of Pakistan.

See also
 Constituency PK-44 (Abbottabad-I)
 Constituency PK-45 (Abbottabad-II)
 Constituency PK-46 (Abbottabad-III)
 Constituency PK-47 (Abbottabad-IV)
 Constituency WR-07
 Constituency WR-15

References

External links 
 Khyber Pakhtunkhwa Assembly's official website
 Election Commission of Pakistan's official website
 Awaztoday.com Search Result
 Election Commission Pakistan Search Result

Khyber Pakhtunkhwa Assembly constituencies